Abbasiyeh may refer to:
 Abbasiyeh, Hamadan
 Abbasiyeh, Kerman
 Abbasiyeh, Khuzestan
 Abbasiyeh, Yazd